Dariusz Kłus (born 11 October 1981) is a Polish former football midfielder.

Career

Club
In February 2010, he moved to Zagłębie Sosnowiec on a half year deal.

In June 2010, he joined ŁKS Łódź on a one-year contract.

References

External links
 

1981 births
Living people
Odra Wodzisław Śląski players
ŁKS Łódź players
MKS Cracovia (football) players
Zagłębie Sosnowiec players
Olimpia Grudziądz players
Ekstraklasa players
Polish footballers
People from Jastrzębie-Zdrój
Sportspeople from Silesian Voivodeship
Association football midfielders